The following lists events that happened during 1941 in the Republic of Ecuador.

Incumbents
President: Carlos Alberto Arroyo del Río

Events
July 5–31 - Ecuadorian–Peruvian War
July 27 - Peruvian Army seize port of Puerto Bolivar

References

 
1940s in Ecuador
Years of the 20th century in Ecuador
Ecuador
Ecuador